This article lists the U.S. governors of the , an archipelago of Japanese islands within Kagoshima and Okinawa prefectures, centered on the Okinawa Islands and its main island, Okinawa (the smallest and least populated of the five Japanese home islands).

The list encompasses the period of U.S. occupation, from the start of the Battle of Okinawa in 1945 until the return of the islands to Japanese sovereignty in 1972, in accordance with the 1971 Okinawa Reversion Agreement.

Officeholders 
Source: 

† denotes people who died in office.

United States Military Government of the Ryukyu Islands (USMGR, 1945–1950)

Military Governors

United States Civil Administration of the Ryukyu Islands (USCAR, 1950–1972)

Governors and Commanders-in-Chief, Far East Command (in Tokyo)

Deputy governors and Commanding Generals, Ryukyu Islands Command (in Naha)

High Commissioners

Civil Administrators

See also 
 History of the Ryukyu Islands
 Government of the Ryukyu Islands, the body of Okinawan self-governance from 1952–1972.
 List of governors of the Nanpō Islands

Notes

References 

List of U.S. governors of the Ryukyu Islands
History of United States expansionism
1945 establishments in Japan
1972 disestablishments in Japan
Japan–United States relations
Postwar Japan
Shōwa period
United States history-related lists
Japan history-related lists
Cold War-related lists
Lists of governors